Musala; from Arabic through Ottoman Turkish: from Musalla, "near God" or "place for prayer"  is the highest peak in the Rila Mountains, as well as in Bulgaria and the entire Balkan Peninsula, standing at .

Musala is also the 3rd most topographically isolated major peak in Continental Europe.

Musala is situated within the Rila National Park, which is noted for its rich flora, including species such as Macedonian Pine and Bulgarian Fir in the forests on its middle slopes, and fauna; it is one of the easiest places in Europe to see the wallcreeper. All major mountain ranges of Bulgaria can be seen from the top; these include Vitosha to the northwest, Sredna Gora towards the northeast, the Balkan Mountains along most of the northern horizon behind Vitosha and Sredna Gora, the Rhodope Mountains to the southeast, Pirin to the south, Osogovo and Ruy Mountain to the west, and of course, the rest of Rila.

A cosmic ray station was built on the peak in 1960 with cooperation from the Hungarian Academy of Science. The station conducted scientific experiments using a muon telescope. The station was destroyed by an electrical fire on October 29, 1983.

With an average annual temperature of -2.3 °C Musala is the coldest place in Bulgaria and the entire Balkan Peninsula. Temperatures stay below 0 °C for about 8 months each year. Due to this about 45% of the annual precipitation on Musala is snow, and snow cover lasts for about 200 days (more than six months). Three of the main rivers of Bulgaria, the Iskar, Maritsa and Mesta have their sources near Musala.

The next highest peaks in the vicinity of Musala are Malka (Little) Musala and Irechek.

Climate 
Peak Musala has an alpine climate with long, cold winters and short, cool summers. Usually, through winter, the temperatures don't exceed the freezing point for months. Snow cover lasts for about 8–9 months. Through the summer, temperatures rarely go above 14-15C. The summer season only lasts for 2 months, and snowfalls are possible.

Namesakes
Musala Glacier on Greenwich Island in the South Shetland Islands, Antarctica is named after Musala Peak.

Gallery

See also
 Rila
 Malyovitsa
 Rila National Park
 List of mountains in Bulgaria
 Geography of Bulgaria
 List of mountains of the Balkans
 List of European ultra-prominent peaks
 List of the highest European ultra-prominent peaks
 Most isolated major summits of Europe
 List of mountain ranges
 List of World Heritage Sites in Bulgaria

References

External links
 Musala – controllable web camera 
 Musala climb on youtube
 

Geography of Southeastern Europe
Highest points of countries
Two-thousanders of Bulgaria
Landforms of Sofia Province
Samokov Municipality
Mountains of Rila
De-Stalinization